Homewood Cemetery is a historic urban cemetery in Pittsburgh, Pennsylvania, United States. It is located in Point Breeze and is bordered by Frick Park, the neighborhood of Squirrel Hill, and the smaller Smithfield Cemetery.

It was established in 1878 from William Wilkins'  estate, Homewood.

Notable interments

Business leaders
 Edward Jay Allen (1830–1915), businessman
 Michael Late Benedum (1869–1959), businessman, co-founder of Benedum-Trees Oil Company
 David Lytle Clark (1864–1939), businessman, creator of Clark Bar and Zagnut
 Henry Clay Frick (1849–1919), industrialist, founder of the South Fork Fishing and Hunting Club
 Henry J. Heinz (1844–1919), founder of H. J. Heinz Company
 H. J. "Jack" Heinz II (1908–1987), industrialist
 Henry Hillman (1918–2016), businessman, investor, civic leader, and philanthropist
 William Larimer Mellon Sr. (1868–1949), founder of Gulf Oil
 Willard Rockwell (1888–1978), founder of Rockwell International
 A.E. Succop (Augustus Ernest) (1847–1931), President Germania Savings Bank and German Fire Insurance Company
 Ernest T. Weir (1875–1957), founder of Weirton Steel and National Steel Corporation
 William Valentin Hartmann (1871–1947), VP of Gulf Oil

Political leaders
 Edward V. Babcock (1864–1948), Mayor of Pittsburgh 1918–22
 Matthew A. Dunn (1886–1942), member of the United States House of Representatives 1933–41
 William Flinn (1851–1924), politician
 Henry P. Ford (1837–1905), Mayor of Pittsburgh 1896–99
 H. John Heinz III (1938–1991), United States Senator 1977–91
 William McCallin (1842–1904), Mayor of Pittsburgh 1887–90
 John K. Tener (1863–1946), Governor of Pennsylvania 1911–15
 William Wilkins (1779–1865), United States Senator from Pennsylvania 1831–34, Secretary of War 1844–45
 George Wilson (1816–1902), Mayor of Pittsburgh 1860–62

Military leaders
 John Wilkins Jr. (1761–1816), Quartermaster General of the United States Army 1796–1802

Artists and musicians
 Erroll Garner (1921–1977), jazz pianist and composer
 Walt Harper (1926–2006), jazz pianist
 Teenie Harris (1908–1998), photographer
 George Hetzel (1826–1899), portrait and landscape painter
 Churchill Kohlman (1906–1983), songwriter
 Malcolm McCormick (Mac Miller) (1992–2018), rapper, singer, record producer
 Anna Woodward (1868–1935), portrait and landscape painter

Science and medicine
 Mary Bidwell Breed (1870–1949), chemist and first female dean of Indiana University
 Bertha Lamme Feicht (1869–1943), first female engineering graduate from Ohio State University and first female engineer to be employed by Westinghouse
 Bernard Fisher (1918–2019), pioneer of breast cancer treatment
 Childs Frick (1883–1965), paleontologist
 John Bell Hatcher (1861–1904), paleontologist
 Edwin Ruud (1854–1932), mechanical engineer and inventor
 Alvin P. Shapiro (1920–1998), physician and educator

Sports figures
 Bill Bishop (1869–1932), professional baseball player
 Chuck Cooper (1926–1984), first African-American to be drafted into the NBA
 Earl Francis (1935–2002), professional baseball player
 Jock Sutherland (1889–1948), football coach
 Pie Traynor (1899–1972), baseball Hall of Famer

Others
 Edward Manning Bigelow (1850–1916), city planner
 Helen Clay Frick (1888–1984), philanthropist
 Rust Heinz (1914–1939), auto and boat designer
 Elsie Hillman (1925–2015), philanthropist and former Republican National Committeewoman
 John Barrett Kerfoot (1816–1881), first Episcopal Bishop of Pittsburgh
 Daisy Elizabeth Adams Lampkin (1883–1965), civil rights activist
 Perle Mesta (1889–1975), Ambassador to Luxembourg 1949–53, and a noted Washington, D.C. socialite during Eisenhower and Nixon eras
 Robert Lee Vann (1879–1940), publisher and editor of the Pittsburgh Courier
 Stephen Varzaly (1890–1957), priest, journalist, and cultural activist
 Tom Boggs (1905–1952), poet

Gallery

See also
 Allegheny Cemetery
 Greenwood Cemetery
 List of cemeteries in the United States

References

External links
 Main Homewood Cemetery website 
 

Cemeteries established in the 1870s
Cemeteries in Pittsburgh
1878 establishments in Pennsylvania
Pittsburgh History & Landmarks Foundation Historic Landmarks
Rural cemeteries